Rick Derringer (born Richard Dean Zehringer; August 5, 1947) is an American guitarist, vocalist, producer and songwriter. He came to prominence in the 1960s as founding member of his band, the McCoys.  Their debut single, "Hang on Sloopy", was a number-one hit in 1965 and became a classic of the garage rock era. The McCoys then had seven songs that charted in the top 100, including versions of "Fever" and "Come on Let’s Go".

In 1974, Derringer reached the US top 30 with his own song, "Rock and Roll, Hoochie Koo". He also worked extensively with the brothers Edgar and Johnny Winter, playing lead and backing guitar in their bands and producing all of their gold and platinum recordings, including Edgar Winter's hits "Frankenstein" and "Free Ride" (both 1973). He has additionally worked with Steely Dan, Cyndi Lauper and "Weird Al" Yankovic, producing Yankovic's Grammy Award-winning songs "Eat It" (1984) and "Fat" (1988). Derringer also produced the World Wrestling Federation's album The Wrestling Album (1985) and its follow-up Piledriver: The Wrestling Album II (1987). The albums included the entrance song for Hulk Hogan, "Real American", and the Demolition tag team, "Demolition". Derringer also produced three songs from the soundtrack of the 1984 Tom Hanks movie Bachelor Party.

Life and career

Early life and 1960s
Derringer was born in Celina, Ohio, and grew up in Fort Recovery, the son of Janice Lavine (Thornburg) and John Otto Zehringer, a section foreman on the Nickel Plate Railroad. According to Derringer, other than his parents' extensive record collection, his first major influence was an uncle, Jim Thornburg, a popular guitarist and singer in Ohio. Derringer has related first hearing him play guitar in the kitchen of his parents' home, and knowing immediately that he wanted to play guitar. He was then eight years old and his parents gave him his first electric guitar for his ninth birthday. It was not long before he and his brother, Randy, were playing music together.

After the eighth grade, the family moved to Union City, Indiana, where he formed a band that he called the McCoys. He later changed the name to the Rick Z Combo and then Rick and the Raiders before going back to the band's original name.

In summer 1965, before Derringer turned 18, the McCoys were hired to back up a New York–based band called the Strangeloves in concert. The members of the Strangeloves were also record producers from New York City and were seeking a band to record a song "My Girl Sloopy," and they chose the McCoys. Derringer later convinced the producers to change the song title to "Hang On Sloopy." After the Strangeloves recorded all the guitar and instrumental parts, Derringer and the McCoys were brought into the studio to sing on the recording and release it under their name. The song stayed at number one while The Beatles's "Yesterday" was number two.

Rick married Liz Agriss in 1969.

1970s
Derringer, with his band, the McCoys, joined Johnny Winter in a band that they called "Johnny Winter And", the "And" referring to the McCoys. Derringer joined Edgar Winter's White Trash and then, the Edgar Winter Group.

In 1973, Derringer released his first solo album All-American Boy, which included his song "Rock and Roll, Hoochie Koo". By then, the song had appeared on Johnny Winter And (1970), and also the White Trash Roadwork (1972) albums.  Derringer's version rose to the Top 20 on the Billboard Hot 100 charts, becoming his highest-charting single. One critic has described the album as a "sadly neglected album of great merit".

Derringer's later albums, both solo and with his band Derringer, included 1977's Sweet Evil which had been co-written with Cynthia Weil and the Rolling Thunder Revue author Larry Sloman, and the critically acclaimed album, Guitars and Women (1979), which was re-released with liner notes by Razor & Tie in 1998.

Around this time he played guitar on two Steely Dan tracks, "Show Biz Kids" on Countdown to Ecstasy (1973) and "Chain Lightning" on Katy Lied (1975).  Derringer is credited with helping Donald Fagen gain a record deal in 1972.

Derringer worked with his neighbor Todd Rundgren during this time, playing on four of Rundgren's solo albums. He was also a regular in Andy Warhol's circle, and he frequented Warhol's studio The Factory.

1980s and 1990s 
Derringer played guitar on "My Rival" on Steely Dan's Gaucho (1980) and also Fagen's first solo album, The Nightfly (1982). In 1983, he played guitar on two hit power ballads written and produced by Jim Steinman: Air Supply's "Making Love Out of Nothing at All" and Bonnie Tyler's "Total Eclipse of the Heart". He has said that his guitar solo in "Making Love Out of Nothing at All" is his favorite guitar solo of the many he has recorded. The same year, he recorded guitar parts for Meat Loaf's poorly received album Midnight at the Lost and Found. Both "Making Love Out of Nothing at All" and "Total Eclipse of the Heart" were originally offered to Meat Loaf by Steinman for that album, but Meat Loaf's record company refused to pay Steinman for the compositions. In 1983, Derringer wrote "Shake Me" from his Good Dirty Fun solo album. A video followed, which was produced by Jake Hooker (the husband of Lorna Luft), singer Lourett Russell Grant modeled in the video production with Derringer.

In 1984, Derringer played guitar on Barbra Streisand's cover version of Steinman's "Left in the Dark", which was released as the lead single of Emotion.

In 1985, Derringer's friendship with Cyndi Lauper led him and Steinman to collaborate again, Derringer producing The Wrestling Album (1985) for the World Wrestling Federation, an album consisting mostly of wrestlers' theme songs. He wrote a couple of songs on it, including Hulk Hogan's theme song "Real American", with Bernard Kenny. That song was also used by US President Barack Obama at the 2011 White House Correspondents' Dinner, where he played the song while unveiling his birth certificate. It was also used as a campaign song by Hillary Clinton, as a victory song by Newt Gingrich, and in four videos during the campaign of Donald Trump.

In 1986, he returned to the Meat Loaf fold for Blind Before I Stop. Derringer co-wrote the song "Masculine".
 
In 1987, Meat Loaf guested on Way Off Broadway, a nationally distributed cable TV show with Derringer as the music director, with the show's host, the comedienne/interviewer Joy Behar. Other guests on the show included Larry Carlton, Robbie Dupree and Edgar Winter.

Also in 1987, Derringer returned to the World Wrestling Federation and produced its second music album, Piledriver: The Wrestling Album II. He co-wrote the theme tune for Demolition and also added a fresh version of "Rock and Roll, Hoochie Koo" as a duet with Gene Okerlund.

He worked for several New York City-based jingle houses in the 1980s. Derringer went on to produce "Weird Al" Yankovic's first album, "Weird Al" Yankovic (1983). Derringer ultimately produced six Yankovic albums between 1983 and 1989; for this work, he received his only Grammy Award. Yankovic has said that he is open to working with Derringer again.

In 1997, Derringer became an Evangelical Christian. Since then, he has consistently aligned himself with conservative causes in the United States. Derringer describes himself as a "Jesus freak".

2000s and 2010s
In 2001, Derringer, Tim Bogert and Carmine Appice released the album Derringer, Bogert & Appice (DBA): Doin' Business as... on the German record label Steamhammer Records. Derringer had previously worked with Appice on an album, Party Tested by DNA (Derringer'n'Appice), and it was re-released in 2011.

In 2001, the couple and their children released the first two of four Christian music albums all Panda Studio Productions: Aiming 4 Heaven (2001),, Derringer X 2 (2001) , the holiday album, Winter Wonderland (2004) , and We Live (2008) .

In 2002, Derringer was featured in a book, written by Dan Muise, called Gallagher, Marriott, Derringer & Trower – Their Lives and Music.

He released Free Ride Smooth Jazz (2002), which had vocals by his wife Jenda (née Brenda Jean), who sang the title song "Free Ride" and, with Derringer, wrote the song "Hot & Cool". Also included is his smooth jazz radio hit re-make, "Jazzy Koo".

In May 2009, he self-released the album Knighted by the Blues and its popular song, "Sometimes", once again, co-written with Jenda. Derringer followed up with the release of The Three Kings of the Blues (Freddie King, B.B. King, Albert King) on Mike Varney's Blues Bureau International Records.

Derringer and a range of hitmakers are part of Voices, a company that finds private events many times a year. Some of the artists involved with Voices are Tone-Loc, Wally Palmar, Kim Carnes, Belinda Carlisle, Tommy Tutone, Mark McGrath, Fastball, Skip Martin, Jakob Dylan, Natasha Bedingfield, Coolio, John Rzeznik, Martha Davis, Silverchair, Steve Augeri, John Elefante, Alex Ligertwood, Jeff Lyons, and the Rembrandts.

Derringer went on three world tours with Ringo Starr & His All-Starr Band. Rehearsals started in June 2010. They traveled in Europe, Russia, South America, Mexico and the USA. The tour featured Wally Palmar, Edgar Winter, Gary Wright, Richard Page and Gregg Bissonette.

In the 1980s, he produced the Kodomo Band. He has toured in Asia, including with Edgar Winter, the 1990 White Lightning Tour in both Japan and Germany.

In 2010, two of Derringer's homes in Florida were foreclosed when he defaulted on a $46,000 line of credit that his wife Brenda J. Hall obtained in 2004 from Branch Banking & Trust Co. The loan was secured by Derringer's Florida property. He was also sued by BAC Home Loans Servicing, a mortgage company servicing another loan on behalf of Fannie Mae. According to BAC, Derringer made no monthly payments in 2010 and owed $242,366 in principal and interest as of October 2010. Derringer blamed the circumstances on 
the housing/mortgage crisis, which contributed to the economic recession of the late 2000s, saying "Anybody can be affected by this huge problem, even us." Derringer was also listed as defendant in another foreclosure complaint on a separate property in 2014 in Manatee County, Florida.

In 2013, he and Jenda created the Asia Project after she discovered that the two largest-selling songs in history are Chinese. As Ricky Wu and Jenda Tu, the Derringers recorded and released their versions. The songs are Wang Qiwen and Yang Chengang’s 2004 song "Mouse Loves Rice", and the actress Lui Shi Shi's "Season of Waiting".

In 2014, Derringer performed on Peter Frampton's Guitar Circus tour with other notable guitarists, including B.B. King, Roger McGuinn (ex-Byrds), Don Felder (ex-Eagles), Leslie West (ex-Mountain), Cheap Trick's Rick Nielsen, Toto's Steve Lukather, Los Lobos' David Hidalgo, and Pearl Jam's Mike McCready.

In 2017, Derringer was charged with carrying a loaded gun on a Delta Air Lines flight from Cancún in Mexico to Atlanta, Georgia. According to his manager, Derringer thought he was permitted to carry the gun, based on his possession of a valid Florida concealed weapon permit. Derringer later pleaded guilty, agreeing to pay a $1,000 fine, saying it would not happen again, "not even a water pistol".

A re-recording of 1985's The Wrestling Albums "Real American" with updated lyrics was released on May 28, 2017, debuting on Alex Jones's radio show. "I gotta be a man, I can't let it slide" was changed to "I gotta lend a hand, I can't let it slide" and "fight for the right of every man" became "fight for the rights of everyone". "Best not mess with my US" is added before the second verse, and a new line says, "Ours is a cause that's right and just, we're built on truth, in God we trust." The same year, Derringer appeared on Alex Jones's show, where he was interviewed by the political consultant Roger Stone about Derringer's support for Donald Trump.

In 2017, Derringer collaborated with the baseball players Tom Seaver and Gary Redus to release a version of "Take Me Out to the Ballgame", honoring his lifelong love of baseball.

In 2018, Derringer embarked on a tour with Vanilla Fudge, Mitch Ryder and Badfinger under the name "HippieFest".

In early 2019, he started an "uncomplicated" crowdfunding page at Patreon. Derringer asks his fans for $10 a month, for which he gives them exclusive content including new music premieres.

He played the guitar solo to an anti-bullying campaign version of "Hang on Sloopy" by the Love Love Kids, released in October 2019.

In other media
"Rock and Roll, Hoochie Koo" is used in the 1993 film Dazed and Confused, as well as in the Xbox 360 version of Guitar Hero II in 2007 and Rock Band 4 in 2015. The song was also made available as downloadable content for the guitar learning software/game Rocksmith 2014 in January 2015.

Discography

Rick DerringerStudio albumsAll American Boy (1973) US No. 25, AUS No. 38
Spring Fever (1975) US No. 141
Derringer (1976) US No. 154
Sweet Evil (1977) US No. 169
If I Weren't So Romantic, I'd Shoot You (1978)
Guitars and Women (1979, re-released 1998)
Face to Face (1980)
Good Dirty Fun (1983)
Back to the Blues (1993)
Electra Blues (1994)
Tend the Fire (1997)
Blues Deluxe (1998)
Jackhammer Blues (2000)
Free Ride (2002)
Rockin' American (2007)
Knighted by the Blues (2009)Live albumsDerringer Live (1977) US No. 123
Live in Cleveland (1977)
King Biscuit Flower Hour (1998)
Live in Japan (1998)With Edgar WinterRick Derringer & Friends (1998)With Edgar Winter, Ian Hunter, Dr. John, Lorna Luft, Hall & OatesLive at Cheney Hall (2006)
Rock Spectacular: Live at the Ritz 1982 (2010)Compilation albumsRequired Rocking (1996)
Rock and Roll Hoochie Koo: The Best of Rick Derringer (1996)
Collection: The Blues Bureau Years (2006)
The Three Kings of the Blues (2010)
Joy Ride: Solo Albums 1973–1980 (2017)
Complete Blue Sky Albums: 1976–1978 (2017)

As guest musicianWith Cyndi Lauper True Colors (Portrait Records, 1986)
 A Night to Remember (Epic Records, 1989)With Steely Dan Countdown to Ecstasy (MCA Records, 1973)
 Katy Lied (ABC Records, 1975)
 Gaucho (MCA Records, 1980)With Edgar WinterEdgar Winter's White Trash (Epic, 1971) 
Roadwork (Epic, 1972)  
They Only Come Out at Night (Epic, 1972)
Shock Treatment (Epic, 1974)
Jasmine Nightdreams (Blue Sky, 1975)
The Edgar Winter Group With Rick Derringer (Epic, 1975)
The Edgar Winter Group with Rick Derringer – Live In Japan (Cypress, 1990)
Winter Blues (Irond, 2009)With Johnny WinterJohnny Winter And (Columbia, 1970)
Live Johnny Winter And (Columbia, 1971)
Still Alive and Well (Columbia, 1973)
Saints & Sinners (Columbia, 1974) 
John Dawson Winter III (Columbia, 1974)With others'''
Jon Anderson – 1000 Hands: Chapter One (Blue Elan Records, 2019)
Joe Bonamassa – A New Day Yesterday (550 Records, 2000)
Alice Cooper – Killer (Warner Bros. Records, 1971)
Donald Fagen – The Nightfly (Warner Bros. Records, 1982)
Dan Hartman – Images (Blue Sky, 1976)
Richie Havens – Alarm Clock (Stormy Forest, 1970)
Richie Havens – Connections (Elektra Records, 1980)
Grayson Hugh – Blind to Reason (MCA Records, 1988)
Thomas Jefferson Kaye –  Thomas Jefferson Kaye (Dunhill Records, 1973)
Thomas Jefferson Kaye – First Gade (ABC Records, 1974)
Kiss – Lick It Up (Mercury Records, 1983)
Bette Midler – Songs for the New Depression (Atlantic Records, 1976)
Neil Sedaka – Come See About Me (MCA Records, 1984)
Barbra Streisand – Emotion (Columbia Records, 1984)
Bonnie Tyler – Faster Than the Speed of Night (Columbia Records, 1983)
Rosie Vela – Zazu (A&M Records, 1986)
"Weird Al" Yankovic – "Weird Al" Yankovic in 3-D'' (Scotti Brothers Records, 1984)

References

External links

 Official website RickDerringer.com
 Rick Derringer biography by Bruce Eder, discography and album reviews, credits & releases at AllMusic
 Rick Derringer discography, album releases & credits at Discogs
 Rick Derringer albums to be listened on Spotify
 Rick Derringer songs & albums to be listened on YouTube

1947 births
Living people
20th-century American guitarists
20th-century American male musicians
20th-century evangelicals
21st-century evangelicals
American blues mandolinists
American evangelicals
American male guitarists
American performers of Christian music
American rock guitarists
Blue Sky Records artists
Epic Records artists
Guitarists from Ohio
People from Fort Recovery, Ohio
Provogue Records artists
Ringo Starr & His All-Starr Band members